Rosemary Davies (born Rose Douras; June 8, 1895 – September 20, 1963) was an American actress.

Life
Born Rose Douras in Brooklyn, New York, Davies was the sister of actresses Marion Davies and Reine Davies, but never reached the same level of fame as her two sisters. However, Rose Davies' name was mentioned in different circles when she was said to be the mother of Patricia Lake by her first husband, George Barnes Van Cleve. After Patricia Lake's death, her family announced that Lake was in fact the daughter of Marion Davies and William Randolph Hearst, born secretly during a trip abroad between 1920 and 1923.

Davies, who had little film experience, was selected to play the title role in the film Alice, which began production in 1924.

Davies married Louis Adlon who was a German-born American motion picture actor. He died March 31, 1947. She died in 1963 in Bel Air, California. She is buried beside her sister Marion in the Douras mausoleum with Marion's husband Horace Brown, Patricia Lake, and Lake's husband, actor Arthur Lake.

References

External links

American film actresses
American silent film actresses
People from Brooklyn
1895 births
1963 deaths
20th-century American actresses